The 2018 Hockey East Men's Ice Hockey Tournament was played between March 2 and March 17, 2018 at campus locations and at the TD Garden in Boston, Massachusetts. Boston University won their 9th tournament and earned Hockey East's automatic bid into the 2018 NCAA Division I Men's Ice Hockey Tournament.

The tournament was the 34th in league history.

Format
The tournament included all eleven teams in the conference. Seeds 1–5 earned a first-round bye, and seeds 6–11 played a best-of-three Opening Round played on campus locations. Winners advanced to play the 1–3 seeds in the best-of-three Quarterfinals on campus locations. Winners of those series played in a single-game Semifinal, and those winners faced off in a single-game Championship Final, both at the TD Garden.

Regular season standings
Note: GP = Games played; W = Wins; L = Losses; T = Ties; PTS = Points; GF = Goals For; GA = Goals Against

Bracket
Teams are reseeded after the Opening Round and Quarterfinals

Note: * denotes overtime period(s)

Results

Opening Round

(6) Maine vs. (11) New Hampshire

(7) Massachusetts–Lowell vs. (10) Merrimack

(8) Massachusetts vs. (9) Vermont

Quarterfinals

(1) Boston College vs. (10) Merrimack

(2) Northeastern vs. (8) Massachusetts

(3) Providence vs. (6) Maine

(4) Boston University vs. (5) Connecticut

Semifinals

(1) Boston College vs. (4) Boston University

(2) Northeastern vs. (3) Providence

Championship

(3) Providence vs. (4) Boston University

Tournament awards

All-Tournament Team
F Jordan Greenway Boston University
F Dylan Sikura Northeastern
F Brandon Duhaime Providence
D Chad Krys Boston University
D Jacob Bryson Providence
G Jake Oettinger* Boston University

* Tournament MVP(s)

References

External links
2018 Hockey East Men's Ice Hockey Tournament

Hockey East Men's Ice Hockey Tournament
Hockey East Men's Ice Hockey Tournament
Hockey East Men's Ice Hockey Tournament
Hockey East Men's Ice Hockey Tournament
Hockey East Men's Ice Hockey Tournament
Ice hockey competitions in Boston